HMS Leveret was a Cruizer-class brig-sloop built at Dover, England, and launched in 1806. She was wrecked in 1807.

Service history
Commander George Salt commissioned Leveret in February 1806. She sailed for the Mediterranean in April 1807 and was off Cadiz, Spain, in July 1806. Later she sailed to the Baltic Sea. On 21 October 1806 she recaptured the brig Beaver, of Great Yarmouth.

Later in October 1806, Commander Richard James Laurence O’Connor took command. She was under his command when she was wrecked on the Galloper Rock near Great Yarmouth during a gale on 10 November 1807. She had been ordered to see Waldemaar, a captured Danish ship-of-the-line, safely into port. There were no deaths as the fishing smack Samuel came up and Leverets crew used her boats to transfer to the smack.

A contemporary newspaper report has the gale forcing Leveret onto the "Long Sand", where she lost her rudder. With  of water in her hold, she was drifting towards the Galloper Rock. As the water level rose, the crew were ordered to abandon ship and took to the boats. A vessel from Ipswich then took them to Harwich.

The court martial, held on board the 44-gun fifth rate frigate  in Sheerness Harbour on 18 November 1807, ruled that O'Connor, his officers, and his crew had made every exertion to save their ship once she had struck. Rear-Admiral Wells, Commander-in-Chief Sheerness, then charged that O'Connor had not helped a frigate "on her beam ends" on the Long Sand on 10 November. The court ruled that O'Connor was blameless and that the charge was not proven. O'Connor's next command was the 18-gun brig .

Notes

Citations

References
 
 
 Michael Phillips’ "Ships of the Old Navy"
 

Maritime incidents in 1807
1806 ships
Ships built in England
Cruizer-class brig-sloops
Ships built in Kent
Shipwrecks in the North Sea
Shipwrecks of England